Pedro IV may refer to:

 Peter IV of Aragon (1319–1387)
 Pedro IV of Kongo (ruled 1694–1718)
 Pedro I of Brazil (Pedro IV of Portugal, 1798–1834)

See also
Peter IV (disambiguation)